Anatina anatina, commonly called smooth duckclam, is a species of bivalves in the family Anatinellidae which is found in America.

References

Mactridae